Mabel Effiom (born June 10, 1995) is a Nigerian professional football player. She is a midfielder for club Bnot Netanya F.C..

Career

Youth career
Scouted at the age of 14 years old by the prestigious Nigerian club Rivers Angels F.C., Effiom joined the Rivers Angels F.C. Academy in 2009.
 2009-2012: Rivers Angels F.C. (Port Harcourt,Nigeria)

Professional career
Effiom began her professional career in 2012 with her Academy Club.

 2012-2014: Rivers Angels F.C. (Port Harcourt,Nigeria)
 2014-2015: JVW F.C. (Bedfordview,South Africa)
 2015-2016: FC Energy Voronezh (Voronezh,Russia)
 2016-2017: Øvrevoll Hosle IL (Øvrevoll,Norway)
 2017-2018: Rivers Angels F.C. (Port Harcourt,Nigeria)
 2018-2020: Bnot Netanya F.C. (Netanya,Israel)
 2020-2021: F.C. Ramat HaSharon (Ramat HaSharon,Israel)
 2021-2022: Bnot Netanya F.C. (Netanya,Israel)
 2022: FF Yzeure Allier Auvergne (Yzeure,France)
 2022-: Bnot Netanya F.C. (Netanya,Israel)

Honors 
 2021-2022: Best passer of the league
 2021-2022: On the 11 best players of the league

References 

1995 births
Nigerian women's footballers
Living people
F.C. Ramat HaSharon players
Ligat Nashim players
Division 2 Féminine players
Expatriate footballers in Norway
Expatriate footballers in Israel
Expatriate footballers in France
Nigerian expatriate sportspeople in Norway
Nigerian expatriate sportspeople in Israel
Nigerian expatriate sportspeople in France
Women's association footballers not categorized by position